Jatun Muqu (Quechua jatun, hatun big, muqu hill, "big hill", also spelled Jatun Mokho) is a mountain in the Bolivian Andes which reaches a height of approximately . It is located in the Chuquisaca Department, Azurduy Province, Tarvita Municipality.

References 

Mountains of Chuquisaca Department